Vladimirskaya is a station of the Saint Petersburg Metro opened on 15 November 1955.

Saint Petersburg Metro stations
Railway stations in Russia opened in 1955
Railway stations located underground in Russia
Cultural heritage monuments of regional significance in Saint Petersburg